Simultala Awasiya Vidyalaya is a school in Simultala, of Jhajha Block, Jamui District in the Indian State of Bihar. The school has a record of producing 30 toppers out of 31 in top 10 of the Bihar School Examination Board in 2015. After the creation of the state of Jharkhand in 2000, the school was  created in 2010 by the effort of politician Nitish Kumar. The students  dominated the International Mathematics Olympiad in 2013. Students participate in  inter-house and inter-set competitions and inter-school competitions.

About

In 2000, after Jharkhand separated from Bihar, realization struck that schools which were established to provide a firm ground to meritorious students like the Indira Gandhi Residential School, Hazaribagh for girls, and Bihar's pride the Netarhat Residential School had both gone to Jharkhand. Since that time, an urgent need was felt to establish schools that would eliminate the vacuum created by their loss. 
On 12 August 2009 some alumni of Netarhat, on the initiative and invitation of the Chief Minister of Bihar, Nitish Kumar, came forward to help the state government by adopting roles suitable for them on the basis of their experience at Netarhat. Taking into consideration the need for the present circumstances it was accepted by general consensus that the medium of instruction would be English. On the suggestion of Chief Minister Kumar in the meeting, it was also decided that only one school would be opened that would be co-educational and would provide a common platform to both meritorious boys and girls to garner quality education under the guidance of qualified and experienced teachers chosen from all over the country.
Under the guidance of the State Government's Human Resource Department's Principal Secretary Anjani Kumar Singh, the department set the wheels in motion in a record time of less than a year. The first batch of 120 students reached Simultala on 6/7 August 2010 and on 9 August 2010, Minister Kumar officially inaugurated Simultala Awasiya Vidyalaya.

Location

Simultala is also connected by roadways to Patna and Deoghar. The journey from Patna to Simultala is pleasant with a beautiful landscape, deep valleys, serpent like roads and the greenery.
It lies on the Howrah–Delhi main line.

Academics
The School's Principal and faculty who have been chosen at the national level are not only entrusted to provide quality education to the students but also to continuously and meticulously watch their progress. The progress report would in each month be marked on the basis of the student's effort, success and sincerity in each subject by that subject's teacher. In an extremely simplified manner, every month students are assessed in a monthly examination in the form of Formative Assessment. Classwork and homework are also continuously monitored. At the end of each term, the Summative Assessment of each paper is done in the traditional examination format where the progress of each student is assessed by that subject's teacher and the progress report card is prepared on the guidelines of C.B.S.E and the finally prepared progress card is sent to the parents/guardians. At the end of each academic year, a traditional examination is held where 50% weightage is given to the combined marks in the various examinations held throughout the year which is combined with the marks gained in the final examination which is prepared using the CGPA procedure.

The school will have 265 working days (inclusive of Sundays, Holi and other official holidays) in one year and 100 days of vacation.
In one academic session, there will be two semesters and one final examination. Holidays would be declared thrice in each session namely summer vacations (60 days) and Festival Break(40 days).
Each semester's results would be worth 50 marks i.e., 10 marks each for 2 formative assessment results and 30 marks for Summative Assessment. For the results of the examinations held at the end of each session, 30% weightage would be given to marks attained in the examination and 10% for the monthly test held. For the annual examination results, 50% weightage would be given to the four formative tests and the two summative tests along with the 50% weightage to the marks gained in the annual examination and the final CGPA would then be prepared.

Fee structure
The fees for the students is fixed on the basis of the income group of the parents/guardians of the child. For families below the poverty line, education in SAV is absolutely free. For parents/ guardians with sufficient income, the entire fees would be charged.
For the selected candidates, the School fees for the entire year would be determined on the combined salary of their parents/guardians as follows:

Admission
Entrance Test

Simultala Residential School offers education from 6th standard to 12th standard. Every year students are selected on the basis of an intrastate competitive examination wherein 60 boys and 60 girls are chosen for admission to class 6th.

Medium of Examination
Although the medium of Instruction at Simultala Residential School is English, the examination would be conducted in both English as well as Hindi.

Age Limit and Other Conditions
Only those candidates would be allowed to sit in the examination whose age as of 1 April is in between 10 and 12 years.
Only those candidates would be allowed to sit in the examinations who have been studying from some recognized school or the one which has obtained NOC from the competent authority/department of the state.
They should be domicile of Bihar.

Ashrams
Concept of Simultala Awasiya Vidyalaya is designed on the basis of the Gurukul Education System where students will stay with Guru and Gurumata in the Ashram System. To understand the value of self-dependence and the dignity of labour, they will perform routine tasks related to house chores like cleaning of their surrounding, utensils they use for eating, and even lavatory. Currently, there are two Ashrams one for Boys and one for Girls.Boys hostel has been subdivided into small wards named as Ramanujan, Dashrath, Vidyapati, Benipuri, Aryabhata and Dinkar whereas girls hostel has been subdivided into small wards named as Kasturba, Ahilya, Sarojini, Mahasundri and Vidhyawasini.

Facilities
Teacher-Student Ratio: The teacher-student ratio in the classrooms and hostel warden and student in the hostels is 1:20 so as to ensure proper care in the overall development of the child.

State of the Art Library: Apart from daily newspapers, weekly, bimonthly and monthly magazines, the library is rich in books on poetry, stories, novels, essays, spirituality, travels, drawings, music, computers and other subjects as well apart from knowledge imparting books in English and Hindi which would be issued to the students for a specific time duration. In the reference section, there are some rare and limited edition books as well from which the students can derive a vast amount of knowledge.

Subjects: Other than arts and Science subjects English, Hindi, Sanskrit, Agriculture, Metallurgy, Music, Drawing, Sculpture, etc. are also mandatory subjects in the students’ time table.

Medium of Instruction: To keep pace with the present trend and demands of changing times, the medium of instruction has been chosen to be English but the special emphasis would also be given on Hindi and Sanskrit to enable the students to be well versed in both.

Computer Centre: There is provision for a computer centre adjoining the library which is well connected to the internet so that the students have access to endless knowledge. Apart from this, for every class, there are computer laboratories with a student /computer system ratio of 1:1.

Yoga, Exercise & Sports: Early morning physical training and yoga is followed by a variety of sports’ inclusion in the time-table. These sports are football, hockey, basketball, cricket, Athletics, Judo, Karate, etc. Apart from outdoor games, indoor games like Table-tennis, Carrom, Chess, Ludo, Badminton, too are encouraged in the Ashrams. There is radio as well for the entertainment of the students.

Cultural Programmes: Plays, Elocution, Antakshari, Singing, Musical Renditions, Dance, debates and such activities form an integral part of the school's curriculum. It is imperative for every student to participate in one or the other such activity. From time to time, play workshops are also arranged for the benefit of the students.

Film Show: Movies have become an indispensable part of our lives these days. Society has always been affected by movies and vice versa. Keeping this aspect in view, children are shown such movies every week which is not only high in entertainment value but also inspirational and knowledgeable. There is a plan for the provision of the ‘Film Appreciation Course’ in the near future.

Co-curricular Activities and Interests: For multidimensional growth, students are encouraged to participate in co-curricular activities like Plays, Essay writing and Quiz contests. Students are encouraged in their fields of interest like music, dance, photography, painting, sculpture, gardening, agriculture, bird watching, mountaineering, radio mechanics, electronics, sight-seeing, etc. by providing such opportunities in a constructive manner. Following clubs are being proposed to be introduced in the school wherein the students would be encouraged to participate in accordance with their interests and convenience: Arts Club, Music Club, Science Club, Geography Club, Drama Club, Agriculture Club, Computer Club, Photography Club, Environment Club and Social Service Society.

School management
The school is run by the 'Simultala Education Society' a society fully funded by the Bihar State Government Human Resource Development Department (HRDD).

General body
President: Mr. Vijay Kumar Choudhary,
Hon. Minister, Ministry of Human Resource Development Department, Bihar Govt.

Vice President:	 Mr. Sanjay Kumar,
Principal Secretary, HRDD, Bihar Govt.

Secretary: Girivar Dayal Singh,
Director (Secondary Education),
Ministry of HRDD Bihar Govt.

Members
Principal Secretary, Finance: Finance Department, Bihar Govt.

Commissioner: Munger Division

District Magistrate: Jamui

Superintendent of Police: Jamui

Director, Secondary Education: HRDD, Govt. of Bihar.

Deputy Director (Secondary Education): HRDD, Govt. of Bihar.

Regional Deputy Education Officer: Munger Division

District Education Officer: Jamui

Civil Surgeon: Jamui

Principal: Simultala Awasiya Vidyalaya

Administrator/Bursor: Simultala Awasiya Vidyalaya

14 members nominated by Human Resource Development Department, Government of Bihar including renowned educationalists, professionals and parents of students of the School

References

External links
http://timesofindia.indiatimes.com/city/patna/With-30-of-31-toppers-Simultala-school-shines-in-Matric-exam/articleshow/47753378.cms

https://www.facebook.com/savbihar/photos_stream?ref=page_internal
http://www.jagran.com/bihar/jamui-12501527.html
http://www.jagran.com/bihar/jamui-7521927.html
http://www.jagran.com/bihar/jamui-7695118.html
http://www.jagran.com/bihar/jamui-12535185.html
https://www.newsstate.com/exams-result-news/bihar-board-10th-result-2019-live-updates-news-state-board-page-click-article-82357.html

Jhajha
Jamui

Educational institutions established in 2010
Schools in Bihar
Jamui district
Boys' schools in India
Boarding schools in Bihar
2010 establishments in Bihar